The New Breed may refer to:

Music
New Breed (music duo), an American Christian Latin hip hop duo
New Breed (band), backing band of Israel Houghton
The New Breed, a 1960s band featuring Timothy B. Schmit
"New Breed" (song), by Joyryde, 2017
50 Cent: The New Breed, a 2003 documentary by 50 Cent

Albums
The New Breed (album), by MC Breed, 1993
New Breed (Jay Park album), 2011/2012
New Breed (Dawn Richard album), 2019

Television
The New Breed (TV series), a 1960s American crime drama
"The New Breed" (The Outer Limits), an episode

Professional wrestling
 The New Breed (ECW), a professional wrestling stable
 The New Breed (professional wrestling tag team), a team consisting of Chris Champion and Sean Royal

See also
 Dig the New Breed, a 1982 album by The Jam